The 1901 Iowa State Cyclones football team was an American football team that represented Iowa State College of Agricultural and Mechanic Arts (later renamed Iowa State University) as an independent during the 1901 college football season. In its first and only season under head coach Edgar M. Clinton, the team compiled a 2–6–2 record and was outscored by a total of 133 to 56. William Scholty was the team captain.

Between 1892 and 1913, the football team played on State Field on land that later became the site of the university's Parks Library.

Schedule

References

Iowa State
Iowa State Cyclones football seasons
Iowa State Cyclones football